Amjaz is a village in Amjaz Rural District, in the Central District of Anbarabad County, Kerman Province, Iran. At the 2006 census, its population was 315, in 63 families.

References 

Populated places in Anbarabad County